Antônio Castilho de Alcântara Machado de Oliveira (May 25, 1901 – April 14, 1935) was a Brazilian journalist, politician and writer. He didn't take part of the Week of Modern Art (1922) in São Paulo, but even though wrote a great many modernist chronicles and short stories and also an unfinished novel. Antônio de Alcântara Machado's extensive correspondence with journalist Prudente de Moraes Neto was published in 1997.

Bibliography 
 Terra Roxa e Outras Terras
 Pathé-Baby, chronicle, 1926
 Brás, Bexiga e Barra Funda, short story, 1927
 Laranja da China, short story, 1928
 Mana Maria, novel, 1936
 Cavaquinho e Saxofone, essay, 1940

Translations 
 Pathé-Baby, foreword by Oswald de Andrade, illustrations by Paim, French translation, notes and afterword by Antoine Chareyre, Paris, Editions Pétra, coll. "Voix d'ailleurs", 2013, 272p.

References

1901 births
1935 deaths
Brazilian male writers